Bani Shadad is a sub-district located in Khwlan District, Sana'a Governorate, Yemen. Bani Shadad had a population of 13807 according to the 2004 census.

References 

Sub-districts in Khwlan District